Rónán, anglicised as Ronan, is a male given name of English, Irish, French, and Breton origin. The name has several meanings such as 'little seal', 'a pledge', and 'a promising oath'. The word for "seal" in Irish Gaelic is "rón".

The name is derived from a very old legend, which tells the story of a mother seal who is warned never to stray too close to the land. When the seal is swept ashore by a huge wave, she becomes trapped in a human form, known as a "Selkie" or "seal maiden". Although she lives as the wife of a fisherman and bears him children, known as "ronans" or "little seals", she never quite loses her "sea-longing". Eventually she finds the "seal-skin" which the fisherman has hidden and slips back into the ocean. However, she cannot forget her husband and children and can be seen swimming close to the shore, keeping a watchful and loving eye on them.

Saints
There are twelve Irish saints bearing the name of Ronan commemorated in the Martyrology of Donegal: These include:
 Ronan of Locronan, a c. 6th century Irish pilgrim saint and hermit in western Brittany
 Rónán Mac Bearaigh (died 665), founder of Druim Inesclainn (Drumshallon) (see Féchín of Fore).
 Rónán of Ulster, brother of St. Carnech, and grandson of Loarn, died 11 January 535.
 Rónán Fionn is honoured as patron of Lan Ronan (Kelminiog) in Iveagh. His feast is celebrated on 22 May, both in Ireland and Scotland. 
 Rónán of Iona is explicitly referred to by Bede in the controversy with his countryman St Finan of Lindisfarne, Bishop of Lindisfarne, 660. This controversy, on the calculation of the date of Easter, was ended at the Synod of Whitby, in 664, when Rónán's views were upheld. This is the saint referred to in the title of Sir Walter Scott's book, Saint Ronan's Well. Scott's St. Ronan was a Celtic monk, Bishop of Kilmaronen, who advocated the use of the Roman rather than Celtic manner. This St Rónán is also the patron saint of the Scottish town of Innerleithen. 
 Rónán of Lismore was a successor of St. Carthage, and several Munster churches were built in his honour. His feast is celebrated on 9 February 763. 
 Another saint of this name is best known by the ruined church of Kilronan (Irish Cill Rónáin), Co. Roscommon, where Turlogh O'Carolan and Bishop O'Rourke are buried.

People with the given name
Ronan Bennett,(born 1956), Northern Irish writer
Ronan Biger (born 1985), French football midfielder 
Ronan & Erwan Bouroullec, Breton designers
Ronan Falcão (born 1985), Equatoguinean footballer
Ronan Farrow (born 1987), American writer and activist
Ronan Hardiman (born 1962), Irish composer
Ronan Harris (born 1967), Irish musician
Ronan Hughes, (born 1998), Scottish footballer
Ronan Huon (1922–2003), Breton writer
Ronan Keane (born 1932), Irish judge
Ronan Keating (born 1977), Irish singer
Ronan Keenan (1932–2007), South African writer
Ronan Labar (born 1989), French badminton player
Ronan Lee (born 1976), Australian politician
Ronan Leprohon (1939–2017), French, Breton politician
Rónán Mac Aodha Bhuí (born 1970), Irish broadcaster
Rónán mac Colmáin (died 605), Irish king
Rónán Mullen (born 1970), Irish politician
Ronan O'Brien (born 1974), Irish writer
Ronan O'Gara (born 1977), Irish rugby player
Ronan O'Rahilly (born 1940), Irish businessman
Rónán Ó Snodaigh (born 1970), Irish musician
Ronan Pallier, (born 1970), French Paralympian athlete 
Ronan Parke (born 1998), British singer
Ronan Pensec (born 1963), Breton cyclist
Ronan Racault (born 1988), French road cyclist 
Ronan Rafferty (born 1964), Northern Irish golfer
Ronan Sheehan (born 1953), Irish writer
Ronan Thompson (2007–2011), American who died of neuroblastoma cancer and subject of Taylor Swift song "Ronan"
Ronan Tynan (born 1960), Irish tenor and Paralympian
Ronan Vibert (born 1964), British actor
Ronan Doran (born 2005), Top Sham

People with the surname
Alfred Ronan (born 1947), American politician
Colin Ronan (1920–1995), British astronomer and writer
Daniel J. Ronan (1914–1969), American politician
Ed Ronan (born 1968), Canadian ice hockey player
Frank Ronan (born 1963), Irish writer
George Ronan, first graduate of West Point to die in action
Kian Ronan (born 2001), Gibraltarian footballer
Niall Ronan (born 1982), Irish rugby player
Saoirse Ronan (born 1994), Irish and American actress
William Ronan (1912-2014), American public servant and academic

Fictional characters
Ronan (Harry Potter), in the Harry Potter universe
Ronan the Accuser, a fictional character in Marvel comic books
Ronan Erudon, in the massively multiplayer online role-playing game Grand Chase
Ronan Lynch, in The Raven Cycle series of fantasy novels by Maggie Stiefvater
Ronan Malloy, in the American soap opera The Young and the Restless
the title character of Ronan the Barbarian, a 1995 novel by James Bibby
Alyson and Tyler Ronan, the lead characters of the game Tell Me Why

See also
Ronon Dex, a fictional character in the Stargate Atlantis television series

References

Irish masculine given names
Breton masculine given names
Irish-language masculine given names